Andy Warhol's Fifteen Minutes is an American talk show hosted by artist Andy Warhol, that aired on MTV from 1985 to 1987. One of the network's earliest series, it featured interviews with up-and-coming musicians such as Courtney Love. Other such talk show guests include Debbie Harry and Chris Stein of Blondie, Nick Rhodes of Duran Duran, Ric Ocasek of the Cars, the Ramones, Grace Jones, Yoko Ono, Judd Nelson, Kevin Dillon, John C. McGinley, and William S. Burroughs.

See also
15 minutes of fame

References

External links
 

1985 American television series debuts
1987 American television series endings
1980s American television talk shows
Andy Warhol
English-language television shows
MTV original programming